Janet Yang (born July 13, 1956) is an American film producer and the current President of the Academy of Motion Picture Arts and Sciences. Yang's award-winning film and TV credits include The Joy Luck Club, The People vs. Larry Flynt, Dark Matter, Indictment: The McMartin Trial, Zero Effect, Shanghai Calling, High Crimes, and the Academy Award-nominated animated feature Over the Moon.

Early life and education
Janet Yang was born on July 13, 1956, in Queens, New York. Yang attended Phillips Exeter Academy, then Brown University, where she focused on Chinese Studies, followed by an MBA from Columbia University.

Career
Yang was President of World Entertainment in San Francisco. She revived this small, local distributor of Hong Kong films, expanded it into exhibition, and was able to garner exclusive representation rights in North America for all films produced in the People's Republic of China. These films included filmmakers Zhang Yimou and Chen Kaige, among others.

Yang's first producing effort was the documentary film, East to West: America Through the Eyes of a Chinese. Yang was hired by several major studios to re-introduce American cinema to the Chinese marketplace after a long hiatus. From 1985 to 1987, she represented three major studios — Universal, Paramount, and MGM/United Artists — and was able to broker the first sale of American studio movies to China since 1949.

In 1985, she was hired to be Steven Spielberg's eyes and ears in China for the filming of the historic production of Empire of the Sun, responsible for liaising with both national and local levels of the Chinese government for its largest production to date. She then segued into a production position at Universal, supervising Spielberg's Amblin account.

From 1989 to 1996, Yang served as President of Ixtlan, the company she formed with Academy Award-winning Writer/Director Oliver Stone, spearheading all aspects of the company's development and production. At Ixtlan, she produced The People vs. Larry Flynt. The film won the 1996 Golden Globe Awards for Best Director and Best Screenplay, and garnered Academy Award nominations for Best Director and Best Actor. Yang also served as executive producer of the groundbreaking film The Joy Luck Club, based on the best-selling novel by Amy Tan and directed by Wayne Wang. Yang executive produced Indictment: The McMartin Trial for which she won both Emmy and Golden Globe Awards for Best Made for Television Movie.

Following her seven-year stint at Ixtlan, she formed the Manifest Film Company with Lisa Henson. Manifest Productions include Carl Franklin's High Crimes, with Morgan Freeman; The Weight of Water, from Academy-Award-winning director Kathryn Bigelow and starring Sean Penn; Zero Effect, starring Bill Pullman and Ben Stiller; and Savior starring Dennis Quaid. Yang also served as the Managing Director in charge of creative content and production at Tang Media Partners. 

Yang produced the acclaimed film Dark Matter, directed by Chen Shi-Zheng and starring Chinese actor Liu Ye and Meryl Streep. Dark Matter premiered at the 2007 Sundance Film Festival and won the Alfred P. Sloan Prize. In 2009, Yang was sought out by Disney Studios to produce High School Musical for Chinese audiences. Her last narrative feature was Shanghai Calling, a romantic comedy set in contemporary Shanghai. Yang was as an Executive Producer on the film, Documented, written and directed by the Pulitzer Prize-winning journalist, Jose Antonio Vargas. In 2020, Yang produced Over The Moon for Netflix.

On May 3, 2020, Janet Yang served as a guest speaker at Asia Society's "Stand Against Racism in the Time of COVID" forum, alongside guests such as Los Angeles Mayor Eric Garcetti and Representative Ted Lieu.

On July 19th, 2022, Yang was feted at the Academy Museum of Motion Pictures with a pillar named in her honor. She is the first Asian American woman to have a pillar at the museum. On August 2nd, 2022, at a meeting of the Board of Governors, Yang was elected as President of the Academy of Motion Picture Arts and Sciences, replacing outgoing President David Rubin, who was ineligible to be re-elected. This made her the first Asian American President of the Academy of Motion Picture Arts and Sciences, and the fourth woman to hold that position.

Membership and community participation
Yang is the President of the Academy of Motion Picture Arts and Sciences; a member of the Committee of 100, an organization of prominent Chinese-Americans; an advisory board member of Asia Society Southern California; the National Committee on US-China Relations and an advisory board member of CAPE, the Coalition of Asian-Pacific Americans in Entertainment. She has taught producing at the Sundance Institute and the Independent Feature Project. She is involved with a number of arts, community and political organizations. She is a co-founder of Gold House, a collective of influential Asians across entertainment, technology, lifestyle, and business. She has also been recognized with a Presidential Fellowship at Loyola Marymount University.

Filmography

Awards

References

External links
 
 Janet Yang Website

1956 births
Living people
People from Queens, New York
Brown University alumni
Columbia Business School alumni
Film producers from New York (state)
American people of Chinese descent